The National Association of Care and Support Workers is a professional body for care workers founded in 2016.  It has offices on Holborn Viaduct.

Karolina Gerlich is the chief executive.  She was born in Poland and came to the UK in 2007.  She works as a home care worker.

It campaigns for the interests of care workers. It questions the commissioning arrangements for care, which lead to poor conditions of employment.  The association says "We cannot expect care workers to deliver care with respect and dignity if they are not treated that way themselves."  It questioned the training implications of changes in the delivery of medicine to care homes.

In July 2019 it started a campaign jointly with Home Care Insight for the compulsory registration of care workers in England, as is the case in the rest of the UK.  In 2022 the Institute of Health and Social Care Management supported the campaign, but on a voluntary registration basis. 

Gerlich joined the Care Workers’ Charity as executive director in March 2020.  The two organisations announced that they were joining forces to support the care workforce.

References

External links
 National Association of Care and Support Workers

Social work organisations in the United Kingdom